The doina is a Romanian musical tune style, possibly with Middle Eastern roots, customary in Romanian peasant music, as well as in Lăutărească. It was also adopted into klezmer music.

Similar tunes are found throughout Eastern Europe and the Balkans.

Origins and characteristics
Béla Bartók discovered the doina in Northern Transylvania in 1912 and he believed it to be uniquely Romanian. After he found similar genres in Ukraine, Albania, Algeria, Middle East and Northern India, he came to the belief that these are part of a family of related genres of Arabo-Persian origin. He particularly linked the Romanian doina to the Turkish/Arabic Makam system. Bartók's conclusions were rejected by some Romanian ethnomusicologists, who accused Bartók of anti-Romanian bias. Nevertheless, the similarities between the Romanian doina and various musical forms from the Middle East have been subsequently documented by both non-Romanian and Romanian scholars. Until the first half of the 20th century, both lăutari and klezmer musicians were recorded using a taksim as an introduction to a tune. The taksim would be later replaced by the doina, which has been described as being similar, though not totally identical to the taksim. Romanian ethnomusicologist and musician Grigore Leşe, after performing with a group of Iranian musicians, noticed that the doinas of Maramureş have "great affinities" with the Arabo-Persian music.

The doina is a free-rhythm, highly ornamented (usually melismatic), improvisational tune. The improvisation is done on a more or less fixed pattern (usually a descending one), by stretching the notes in a rubato-like manner, according to the performer's mood and imagination. Usually the prolonged notes are the fourth or fifth above the floor note.

The peasant doinas are mostly vocal and monophonic and are sung with some vocal peculiarities that vary from place to place: interjections (măi, hei, dui-dui, iuhu), glottal clucking sounds, choked sobbing effects, etc. Instrumental doinas are played on simple instruments, usually various types of flutes, or even on rudimentary ones, such as a leaf. The peasant doina is a non-ceremonial type of song and is generally sung in solitude, having an important psychological action: to "ease one's soul" (de stâmpărare in Romanian). Grigore Leşe believes that, while scholars describe in great detail the technical aspects of the doina, they fail to understand its psychological aspects. Doinas are lyrical in aspect and their common themes are melancholy, longing (dor), erotic feelings, love for nature, complaints about the bitterness of life or invocations to God to help ease pain, etc.

Unlike peasant doinas, lăutar and klezmer doinas are usually accompanied and played on more complex instruments (violin, pan-pipe, cymbalom, accordion, clarinet, tarogato, etc.). Also, unlike peasant doinas, lăutar and klezmer doinas are mostly played as an introduction to another tune, usually a dance.

In the regions of Southern Romania, Romani lăutari developed a type of doina called cântec de ascultare (meaning "song for listening", sometimes shortened to de ascultare or simply ascultare). The cântec de ascultare spread to other regions of Romania, with local particularities.

Klezmer Doinas are influenced by Hassidic niguns.

Etymology

Before being studied by ethnomusicologists, the doina type of song was known by many names varying from region to region throughout Romania and Moldova, doina being one of them. It was Constantin Brăiloiu, director of the National Archive of Folk Music, who proposed that the word doina be used to describe all these songs.

The origin of the word doina is unknown. It could be an old Indo-European term, since a similar form (daina) can be found in Latvia with the meaning of "folk song" and in Lithuania with the meaning of "song".

Dimitrie Cantemir mentions Doina in his Descriptio Moldaviae among a series of old pre-Christian (Dacian) deities, persistent in popular oral tradition, adding that Doina, Doina is a starting phrase incantation in many folk songs.

In the region of Maramureş the word horă/hore is still the most commonly used; it is a Romanian word which translates into "shepherd's lament" or "shepherd's longing", which helps explain why doinas can be very melancholy, but have melodies that are rather poignant and heartfelt. The Maramureş horă/hore is not related to the word horă found in southern and eastern Romania, which may stem either from the Greek choros, meaning "(circle) dance" or (less likely) from Latin oro/orare, meaning "to say/saying/pray".

Types of doina
Hora lungă - Maramureş.
Ca pe luncă - found along the Danube.
Oltului - found along the Olt River.
De codru - codru means "forest".
Haiduceşti  (cântece haiduceşti, Cântece de haiducie) - "haiduc's songs" haiduc means "outlaw" or "brigand".
Ca din tulnic - unique type in which the melody imitates a type of Alpenhorn called the tulnic.
Ciobanului - shepherd's doina.
De dragoste - popular form, usually about love; dragoste means "love".
De jale - mellow, mournful doina; jale means "grief".
De leagăn - a lullaby; leagăn means "cradle".
De pahar - drinking song; pahar means "drinking glass".
Foaie verde - classical form; literally "green leaf".
Klezmer - played by Jewish musicians from Bessarabia and Moldavia.

Current status
While at the beginning of the 20th century, the doina was the most common type of peasant song (in some areas the only type), today it has almost completely disappeared from peasant life, as most peasant music has. This process has been accentuated during the communist era, with the rise of the new, so-called "popular music", bringing a new style of performance that diluted the peasant styles.

The doina is still, however, common in the repertoire of the lăutari from Ardeal and Banat regions.

In 1976 Gheorge Zamfir found popular success in the English-speaking world when the BBC religious television programme The Light of Experience adopted his recording of "Doina De Jale" as its theme. Popular demand forced Epic Records to release the tune as a single and it climbed to number four in the UK charts.

In 2009 the doina has been included in the UNESCO list of Intangible Cultural Heritage.

References

Romanian music
Moldovan music
Klezmer
Intangible Cultural Heritage of Humanity